Train Operator of the Year is a rail transport industry award to recognise excellence among train operating companies of the United Kingdom. The award has been presented as part of the Rail Business Awards since 1997.

A similarly named award is also presented by the Rail Delivery Group as part of that organisation's National Cycle-Rail Awards to recognise work in encouraging the use of bicycles and trains as a commuting solution.

Recipients 
Past recipients of this award include:
 1999 - Midland Mainline
 2000 - Anglia Railways
 2001 - Chiltern Railways
 2002 - Chiltern Railways
 2003 - Anglia Railways
 2004 - London Underground
 2005 - Eurostar
 2006 - Freightliner
 2007 - Virgin Trains West Coast
 2008 - Northern Rail
 2009 - First Great Western
 2010 - Northern Rail
 2011 - South West Trains
 2012 - First TransPennine Express
 2013 - Abellio Greater Anglia
 2014 - Merseyrail
 2015 - London Underground
 2016 - London Overground Rail Operations
 2017 - Chiltern Railways
 2018 - KeolisAmey Docklands
 2019 - Abellio Greater Anglia

See also 
 Regional Railroad of the Year and Short Line Railroad of the Year for comparable awards in the United States.

References 

Rail transport industry awards
Awards established in 1997